Brittany Amanda Baxter (née Timko) (born September 5, 1985) is a Canadian retired soccer player who played professionally for five different clubs and earned 132 caps with the Canadian National Team.

Club career
Baxter's first senior club team was Vancouver Whitecaps Women. She also played on the University of Nebraska–Lincoln soccer team from 2003 to 2007, graduating in May 2007. She then signed for Melbourne Victory of Australia's newly formed W-League in October 2008, linking up with her former coach Matt Shepherd.

In the first half of the 2009–10 season Baxter played in Sweden's Damallsvenskan league for Piteå IF, and in the second played for SG Essen-Schönebeck. She left Essen-Schönebeck during the summer of 2010.

Baxter was signed by the Seattle Sounders Women in the W-League on May 2, 2014.

International career
Baxter enjoyed international success at the youth level, where she played mostly as a forward. She earned the Adidas Golden Shoe as top scorer at the 2004 FIFA U-19 Women's World Championship with seven goals in four games.

Baxter won the gold medal at the 2011 Pan American Games soccer tournament  when Canada defeated Brazil 4–3 in penalty kicks.

Baxter was a member of the two Olympic Teams for Canada, in 2008 and 2012. She won a bronze medal in 2012, when Canada defeated France 1–0 in the bronze medal match.

Baxter played in the FIFA Women's World Cup in 2007 and 2011.

Baxter retired from professional soccer following the 2014 season. She finished her international career with 132 caps and 5 goals. She was honoured by Canada Soccer in a halftime ceremony during a Canada vs. United States friendly on November 9, 2017, alongside teammates Chelsea Stewart and Kelly Parker.

Coaching
Since retiring from professional soccer, Baxter has moved into coaching. She is the head girls’ soccer coach at the Port Moody Soccer Association in British Columbia.

Honours 
 2022: Canada Soccer Hall of Fame

Personal life
Baxter and her husband Sean, have two children, a son, Johnny and a daughter Zoe.

References

External links
 / Canada Soccer Hall of Fame
 Bio at Melbourne Victory
 Nebraska player bio

1985 births
Living people
Canadian expatriate sportspeople in Germany
Canadian expatriate sportspeople in the United States
Canadian expatriate women's soccer players
Canadian women's soccer players
Canada women's international soccer players
Canadian people of Ukrainian descent
Women's association football midfielders
Expatriate women's soccer players in Australia
Women's association football forwards
Footballers at the 2008 Summer Olympics
Footballers at the 2011 Pan American Games
Footballers at the 2012 Summer Olympics
Olympic soccer players of Canada
Nebraska Cornhuskers women's soccer players
Soccer players from Vancouver
Expatriate women's footballers in Germany
Vancouver Whitecaps FC (women) players
Melbourne Victory FC (A-League Women) players
SGS Essen players
Expatriate footballers in Sweden
FIFA Century Club
2011 FIFA Women's World Cup players
USL W-League (1995–2015) players
Olympic medalists in football
Olympic bronze medalists for Canada
Medalists at the 2012 Summer Olympics
Seattle Sounders Women players
Pan American Games gold medalists for Canada
Pan American Games bronze medalists for Canada
Pan American Games medalists in football
2007 FIFA Women's World Cup players
Damallsvenskan players
Piteå IF (women) players
2003 FIFA Women's World Cup players
Medalists at the 2011 Pan American Games